Louis McGuffie VC (15 March 1893 – 4 October 1918) was a Scottish recipient of the Victoria Cross, the highest and most prestigious award for gallantry in the face of the enemy that can be awarded to British and Commonwealth forces. A soldier with The King's Own Scottish Borderers, he was awarded the VC for his actions in late September 1918, during the Hundred Days Offensive of the First World War. He was killed in action a few days later.

Early life
Louis McGuffie was born on 15 March 1893 in Wigtown, a town in Galloway, Scotland, one of four sons born to Edward McGuffie and Catherine . He attended Wigtown Public School and then joined the British Army, enlisting in the 1/5th Battalion of The King's Own Scottish Borderers. He had three brothers who also enlisted.

First World War
McGuffie served with the 1/5th Battalion in the Gallipoli Campaign as part of the 52nd Division. After the evacuation from Gallipoli, he participated with the battalion in the Sinai and Palestine Campaign before it was transferred to the Western Front in France.

By the time of the Hundred Days Offensive, he was a sergeant. With the battalion part of 103rd Brigade, 34th Division, on 28 September 1918 it was involved in attacks on Wytschaete Ridge, near Ypres, as part of the Fifth Battle of Ypres. McGuffie had taken command of a platoon due to its officers becoming casualties and helped deal with a strongpoint known as Picadilly Farm, as well as several other German-occupied posts that were delaying the advance. Wytschaete Ridge was captured the following day. However McGuffie was killed in action a few days later on 4 October 1918. For his actions on 28 September 1918, he was awarded the Victoria Cross (VC). The VC, instituted in 1856, was the highest award for valour that could be bestowed on a soldier of the British Empire. The citation read as follows:

McGuffie is buried in Zantvoorde British Cemetery, near Ypres, in Belgium. King George V presented McGuffie's VC to his mother in a ceremony at Buckingham Palace on 17 May 1919. In his memory, a tablet was laid into the wall of the Wigtown County building in late 1919. His name is also listed on the Wigtown War Memorial.

The medal
In 1971, a family member donated McGuffie's VC and other campaign medals, which included the 1914-15 Star, the British War Medal, and the Victory Medal, to the Regimental Museum of The Kings Own Scottish Borderers, Berwick upon Tweed in Northumberland.

Notes

References

1893 births
1918 deaths
British World War I recipients of the Victoria Cross
British Army personnel of World War I
King's Own Scottish Borderers soldiers
British military personnel killed in World War I
People from Wigtown
British Army recipients of the Victoria Cross